Ghetto, Gutter & Gangsta is the sixth studio album by the American gangsta rapper Mack 10. It was released on July 22, 2003, via Hoo-Bangin'/Bungalo Records with distribution by Universal Music. Recording sessions took place at Hoo Bangin Studios. Production was handled by Young Tre, Damizza, Droop-E, King Tech and E. Lamore, with Mack 10 serving as executive producer. It features contributions from Be Brazy, Butch Cassidy, Cousteau, Deviossi, E-40, Fat Joe, J-Man, K-Mac, Knoc-turn'al, Money Grip, Reservoir Dogs, Skoop Delania, The Mossie, Turf Talk, Westside Connection and Young Hoggs. The album peaked at No. 105 on the Billboard 200 albums chart in the United States.

Track listing

Charts

References

Mack 10 albums
2003 compilation albums
Albums produced by Damizza
Albums produced by Droop-E